The Gold Medal is the highest award of the Australian Institute of Architects, awarded annually since 1960. The award was created to recognise distinguished service by Australian architects who have: 
 designed or executed buildings of high merit; 
 produced work of great distinction resulting in the advancement of architecture; or 
 endowed the profession of architecture in a distinguished manner.

Until August 2008, the Institute traded as the Royal Australian Institute of Architects and the award was called the RAIA Gold Medal.

Winners

 1960 Leslie Wilkinson 
 1961 Louis Laybourne-Smith 
 1962 Joseph Fowell 
 1963 Arthur Stephenson
 1964 Cobden Parkes 
 1965 Osborn McCutcheon
 1966 William Laurie 
 1967 William Godfrey
 1968 Roy Grounds
 1969 Robin Boyd
 1970 Jack McConnell
 1971 Frederick Lucas
 1972 Ted Farmer
 1973 Jørn Utzon 
 1974 Raymond Berg 
 1975 Sydney Ancher 
 1976 Harry Seidler 
 1977 Ronald Gilling 
 1978 Mervyn Parry
 1979 Bryce Mortlock
 1980 John Andrews
 1981 Colin Madigan
 1982 John Overall
 1983 Gilbert Nicol & Ross Chisholm 
 1984 Philip Cox
 1985 Richard Norman Johnson
 1986 Richard Butterworth
 1987 Daryl Jackson
 1988 Romaldo Giurgola
 1989 Robin Gibson
 1990 Peter McIntyre
 1991 Donald Bailey
 1992 Glenn Murcutt
 1993 Ken Woolley
 1994 Neville Quarry
 1995 no award
 1996 John Denton, William Corker & Barry Marshall
 1997 Roy Simpson
 1998 Gabriel Poole
 1999 Richard Leplastrier
 2000 John Morphett
 2001 Keith Cottier
 2002 Brit Andresen
 2003 Peter Corrigan
 2004 Gregory Burgess
 2005 James Birrell
 2006 Kerry Hill
 2007 Enrico Taglietti
 2008 Richard Johnson
 2009 Ken Maher
 2010 Kerry Clare and Lindsay Clare
 2011 Graeme Gunn
 2012 Lawrence Nield
 2013 Peter Wilson
 2014 Phil Harris and Adrian Welke
 2015 Peter Stutchbury
 2016 ARM Architecture
 2017 Peter Elliott
 2018 Alexander Tzannes
 2019 Hank Koning and Julie Eizenberg
 2020 John Wardle
 2021 Don Watson

References

External links
Gold Medal at Australian Institute of Architects website

Architecture awards
Architecture in Australia
Australian awards
1960 establishments in Australia
Awards established in 1960